A business agent may refer to:

 A business manager
 Business agent (labor), a representative of a labor union local (North America)